Frances Apsley (1653–7. June 1727), later Lady Bathurst, was a maid of honour to the future Queen Mary II of England and her younger sister, the future Queen Anne, the daughters of the Duke and Duchess of York. She was the daughter of Sir Allen Apsley and his wife, the former Frances Petre.

Letters written to her by a sentimental adolescent Princess Mary reveal that she idolised Frances Apsley. Whilst there are some historians who believe the writings to be evidence of Mary's homosexuality, most historians disagree; Mary's marriage to William of Orange was a happy one and she seems to have been deeply in love with her husband. She did, however, maintain a platonic friendship with Frances, who married Sir Benjamin Bathurst, via ongoing correspondence.

References

1653 births
1727 deaths
Frances
English letter writers
Women letter writers
British maids of honour
Mary II of England
17th-century English women
18th-century English people
18th-century English women
Anne, Queen of Great Britain
Court of Charles II of England